Sišćani is a village in Croatia, located in the municipality of Čazma, Bjelovar-Bilogora.

Sišćani is also known as the Storks village due to the existence of several nests of White stork.

References

Populated places in Bjelovar-Bilogora County